Henry Lewis Darwin (December 21, 1886 — February 6, 1945) was a Texas Democratic politician that served in the Texas Senate.

Personal life
On December 21, 1886, Henry Lewis Darwin was born in Delta County, Texas. He was a staunch supporter of the University of Texas. He died on February 6, 1945, and is buried in Cooper, Texas.

Political career
During the 33rd Texas legislature (1913−1917), Darwin represented Texas Senate district 2, which was composed of Fannin County and Lamar County. He would later go on to serve Texas Senate district 3 during the 37th legislature (1921−1935), representing Delta County, Franklin County, Hopkins County, Red River County, and Titus County. He was a member of the Democratic Party.

References

1866 births
1945 deaths
Texas state senators